Qazian-e Sofla (also Romanized as Qāẕīān-e Soflá; also known as Ghāzīān-e Pā’īn, Qaşr-e Jadīd, Qāẕīān, and Qāẕīān-e Pā’īn) is a village in Shahidabad Rural District, Mashhad-e Morghab District, Khorrambid County, Fars Province, Iran. At the 2006 census, its population was 382, in 94 families.

References 

Populated places in Khorrambid County